Cherry is a 1972 album by saxophonist Stanley Turrentine featuring Milt Jackson.

Track listing
 "Speedball" (Lee Morgan) – 6:39
 "I Remember You" (Johnny Mercer, Victor Schertzinger) – 5:10
 "The Revs" (Milt Jackson) – 7:46
 "Sister Sanctified" (Weldon Irvine) - 6:04
 "Cherry" (Ray Gilbert, Don Redman) – 5:10
 "Introspective" (Irvine) - 7:00
 "The More I See You" (Gordon, Warren) - 7:56 Bonus track on CD

Personnel
Stanley Turrentine - tenor saxophone
Milt Jackson - vibraphone
Bob James - piano, electric piano, arranger
Cornell Dupree - guitar 
Ron Carter - bass  
Billy Cobham - drums
Weldon Irvine Jr. - arranger (#6, 7)

References

1972 albums
Milt Jackson albums
CTI Records albums
Albums arranged by Weldon Irvine
Albums produced by Creed Taylor
Stanley Turrentine albums
Albums recorded at Van Gelder Studio